Paolo Treu is an Italian naval officer.

He graduated from the Italian Naval Academy in 1981 after which he went to the United States to complete Jet and Helicopter training.

In 2004 he commanded the aircraft carrier Giuseppe Garibaldi. In 2008 he was appointed Head of Naval Aviation. He commanded the 30th Naval Group from 12 November 2013 to 9 April 2014. In 2014 he was appointed Director of Armament Programmes for the Italian Defence Force. He was promoted to vice admiral in 2016 and appointed Deputy Chief of Staff of the Navy. He served as Commander in Chief Naval Fleet from 13 October 2019 till July 2021.

References

Italian admirals
1957 births
Living people